Chung Kyo-mo (born 25 July 1938) is a South Korean middle-distance runner. He competed in the men's 800 metres at the 1964 Summer Olympics.

He married Lee Hak-ja and immigrated to the Texas, United States.

References

1938 births
Living people
Athletes (track and field) at the 1964 Summer Olympics
South Korean male middle-distance runners
Olympic athletes of South Korea
Place of birth missing (living people)
South Korean emigrants to the United States